Fahn is an English, German and Jewish surname. The name derives from the Yiddish word fayn meaning 'nice'. Notable people with the surname include:

 Avraham Fahn (1916–2012), Israeli professor of botany
 Mike Fahn (born 1960), American jazz trombonist
 Melissa Fahn (born 1973), American voice/stage actress and singer
 Tom Fahn (born 1962), American voice actor
 Jonathan Fahn (born 1965), voice actor

See also
 Fan (disambiguation)
 Fah (disambiguation)